Gotem is a small town in the Limburg province of Belgium and is part of the municipality of Borgloon.

Statistics
Population: 282 (1 January 2002)
Postal code: 3840
Coordinates: 50° 47' 60" N, 5° 17' 60" E
Elevation: 58 meters

Points of interest
 Kasteel Fonteinhof 
 Church of Saint Denis

References

Populated places in Limburg (Belgium)